Bellamkonda is a village in Palnadu district of the Indian state of Andhra Pradesh. It is the headquarters of Bellamkonda mandal in Sattenapalli revenue division.

Geography 

Demographics 

The average literacy rate stands at 57.08% with  literates.

Governance 

Bellamkonda gram panchayat is the local self-government of the village. It is divided into wards and each ward is represented by a ward member.

Education 

As per the school information report for the academic year 2018–19, the village has a total of 12 schools. These schools include one KGBV, one APTWR, one private and 9 Zilla/Mandal Parishad.

See also 
List of villages in Guntur district

References 

Villages in Guntur district
Mandal headquarters in Guntur district
Forts in Andhra Pradesh